The 1988 Belgian Grand Prix (formally the XLVI Champion Belgian Grand Prix) was a Formula One motor race held at the Circuit de Spa-Francorchamps on 28 August 1988. It was the eleventh race of the 1988 Formula One World Championship.

The 43-lap race was won from pole position by Brazilian driver Ayrton Senna, driving a McLaren-Honda. Senna's French teammate Alain Prost was second, with Italy's Ivan Capelli third in a March-Judd after the Benetton-Fords of local driver Thierry Boutsen and Alessandro Nannini were disqualified for fuel irregularities.

The win, Senna's seventh of the season and fourth in succession, gave him a three-point lead over Prost in the Drivers' Championship.

Qualifying summary
This was the first race after the death of Enzo Ferrari. Nigel Mansell was forced to miss the race due to chicken pox and was replaced at Williams by Martin Brundle who actually managed to be fastest in the second, wet qualifying session. This was the first race in 1988 where neither of the new EuroBrun cars made the field.

Riccardo Patrese did a fine job to be 5th on the grid in his naturally aspirated Williams-Judd, but his time of 1:57.138 was still 3.420 seconds slower than pole man Senna. Local driver Thierry Boutsen gave the Belgian crowd something to cheer when he put his Benetton-Ford in 6th place on the grid.

The grid was set by Friday's qualifying session as Saturday's qualifying was held in wet conditions. Martin Brundle surprised by being fastest in the Williams, but even more of a surprise was Satoru Nakajima who was second fastest in his Lotus-Honda. Alain Prost, never a fan of driving in the wet and knowing his second place on the grid was safe, did not drive in the second session.

The Minardis of Luis Pérez-Sala and Pierluigi Martini, Stefano Modena in the EuroBrun and Julian Bailey in the Tyrrell all failed to qualify while Modena's teammate Oscar Larrauri failed to pre-qualify.

Race summary
Throughout 1988, Senna had copied Prost's car settings feeling that the Frenchman had a better handle on setting up the McLaren (after driving Prost's spare car in Brazil he found that his teammates settings actually suited his own driving style, plus they were easier on the car). At Spa Prost decided at the last minute to alter the settings on his car by taking off some wing for more straight line speed in a bid to gain an advantage. Unfortunately for the Frenchman this had a detrimental result and he was unhappy with the balance and handling of his car in the race, compared to Senna with Prost's original settings who reported no such problems. At the start, pole sitter Senna had too much wheelspin and Prost was able to take the lead. However, the first time through Eau Rouge, Senna, with better downforce and grip, was clearly quicker and easily retook the lead after he slipstreamed Prost on the Kemmel Straight and out braked him at Les Combes. Senna powered off into the distance while Prost, struggling with a car that was no longer handling to his liking, settled for second place.

Gerhard Berger managed to get his Ferrari up to 3rd, challenging Prost briefly before pitting on lap 3 with electrical problems. He managed to rejoin and set the fastest lap before retiring on lap 12. Due to Berger's retirement, Boutsen climbed to 4th behind Alboreto and ahead of a thrilling battle between Alessandro Nannini (Benetton), Nakajima, Nelson Piquet (Lotus), and the two Arrows-Megatrons of Derek Warwick and Eddie Cheever. Piquet passed teammate Nakajima on lap 17, before the Japanese driver pitted with an acute misfire from a jammed plug, which caused him to retire. In the meantime, Ivan Capelli climbed from ninth to sixth in his March-Judd.

On lap 36, Alboreto's engine blew at Les Combes, sending him out of the race from third. On lap 38, Nannini passed Piquet for fourth at the La Source hairpin, before Capelli overtook the Brazilian driver for fifth on the penultimate lap.

McLaren's 1-2 sealed the Constructors' Championship for the British team with five races remaining. Boutsen and Nannini came home third and fourth for Benetton, with Capelli and Piquet rounding out the top six. In a post-race interview, Prost virtually conceded the championship to Senna, who had won his fourth race in succession and had taken the championship lead for the first time.

Post-race
Both Benettons were later disqualified for using irregular fuel, so the third podium spot went to Ivan Capelli. It was his first podium finish in Formula One and March's first podium finish since Ronnie Peterson had won the 1976 Italian Grand Prix. The post race disqualification of the Benettons also meant that the two Arrows of Warwick and Cheever went into the points.

The disqualification of the Benettons was not made official until long after the season had finished, so many published records list them as having finished third and fourth. The three points Arrows gained from the disqualification brought the team to fifth in the Constructors' Championship.

Classification

Pre-qualifying

Qualifying

Race

Championship standings after the race
Bold Text indicates World Champions.

Drivers' Championship standings

Constructors' Championship standings

 Note: Only the top five positions are included for both sets of standings. Points accurate at final declaration of results. The Benettons were disqualified from this race, and their points reallocated, after the end of the season.

References

Belgian Grand Prix
Belgian Grand Prix
Grand Prix
Belgian Grand Prix